The 1978 PGA Tour season was played from January 5 to November 5. The season consisted of 44 official money events. Tom Watson won the most tournaments, five, and there were seven first-time winners. The tournament results and award winners are listed below.

Schedule
The following table lists official events during the 1978 season.

Unofficial events
The following events were sanctioned by the PGA Tour, but did not carry official money, nor were wins official.

Awards

See also
Fall 1977 PGA Tour Qualifying School graduates

Notes

References

External links
PGA Tour official site
1978 season coverage at golfstats.com

PGA Tour seasons
PGA Tour